In rugby union, a citing commissioner is an independent official, appointed by the competition organizer, the union in which the match is taking place, or the World Rugby, who is responsible for citing players who commit any act of foul play which in the opinion of the Citing Commissioner warranted the player concerned being Ordered Off (Red card).

Citing Commissioners may cite Players for an act(s) of foul play where such act(s) may have been detected by the referee or assistant referee and which may have been the subject of referee action. A Citing Commissioner may not cite a Player for an act(s) of Foul Play in respect of which the Player has been Ordered Off save where the Ordering Off is as a result of two yellow cards. A Player in that situation may also be cited for the act(s) of Foul Play which resulted in either or both yellow card(s).

Citing Commissioners may cite a Player if he has been Temporarily Suspended (Yellow card). Such citing may be made in respect of the incident(s) for which the Player was Temporarily Suspended or otherwise. A citing complaint by a Citing Commissioner
must be sent in writing to the nominated officer of the Host Union or Tournament Organiser responsible for the Match in which the incident that is the subject of the citing complaint occurred within ordinarily a minimum of 12 hours and no later than a
maximum of 48 hours of the conclusion of the Match.

Teams may bring offences to the attention of the citing commissioner for review. The citing commissioner may cite a player even if the referee has already dealt with the issue (except where the player has been Ordered Off). Where there is no Citing Commissioner appointed, each team participating in a Match, or any of its authorised officials, or its Union, may cite:
(i) a Player(s) for an act(s) of alleged Foul Play committed during that Match provided that such act(s) have not been detected by the Match Officials;
(ii) a Player for more than one incident of alleged Foul Play in the same Match; and
(iii) more than one Player in any Match. 
Citing complaints must be notified within 48 hours of the conclusion of the match

A player who is cited is called to a hearing to show cause why he should not be treated as having been sent off for the alleged offence. The player is entitled to be represented. The hearing usually takes place before three independent persons nominated by the union or the competition organizer, and is generally convened within a week of the match in question. If the offence is proven, the panel issues a penalty, usually in the form of a suspension for a number of weeks.

References
International Rugby Board

Rugby union officials